The first season of The Voice of the Philippines was a Philippine reality singing competition. It was part of The Voice franchise and was based from a similar competition format in the Netherlands called The Voice of Holland. The show was hosted by Toni Gonzaga with Robi Domingo, and Alex Gonzaga serving as the V-Reporters or as the social media correspondents. Bamboo Mañalac, Sarah Geronimo, Lea Salonga, and apl.de.ap serves as the four coaches and the judging panel of the show.

The show had a primer called Mic Test: The Voice of the Philippines Primer and was aired on June 9, 2013. The first season premiered on June 15, 2013 on ABS-CBN. It aired every Saturdays at 9:00 p.m. (PST), and Sundays at 8:15 p.m. (PST). It was also aired internationally via The Filipino Channel, ABS-CBN's international channel.

On September 29, 2013, Mitoy Yonting of Team Lea won the competition winning the grand prize of two million pesos along with an Asian tour, a brand new car, an entertainment package, and a four-year recording contract. Klarisse de Guzman of Team Sarah was proclaimed as the runner-up.

Development
ABS-CBN acquired the rights of the franchise back in 2011 after the success of its US counterpart. The Philippines was then listed as one of the countries who bought the rights for the franchise as posted in Talpa's website. The show was later confirmed by Laurenti Dyogi, a Filipino director who had notable success with reality shows like Pinoy Big Brother, Pinoy Dream Academy, and Junior MasterChef Pinoy Edition.

A teaser was shown during the commercial break of Sarah G. Live and Gandang Gabi Vice last December 30, 2012. A teaser, showing the recorded snippets of the blind auditions, was aired on May 15, 2013. Another trailer was posted in the show's official Facebook fan page on May 24, 2013, showing the coaches' bantering, rapport, and eagerness to fight over an auditionee.

A teaser revealed the premier date of the show was aired during the final performance night of the fourth season of Pilipinas Got Talent. A primer, dubbed as Mic Test: The Voice of the Philippines Primer, was also announced in the same night. It aired on June 9, 2013. The primer had a special participation of Danny O'Donoghue, The Script's frontman, who at that time sits as a coach in The Voice UK.

Coaches and hosts

Rumors had been circulating that Toni Gonzaga and Robi Domingo, and even Lea Salonga were said to host the show. Also, Zsa Zsa Padilla was rumored as one of the coaches. However, all of these rumors were debunked as the production team stated that there were still no confirmed hosts or coaches for the reality show.

After months of speculations, Toni Gonzaga was confirmed to host the franchise. It was announced on Gonzaga's talk show, The Buzz. Gonzaga later confirmed that she will be joined by Robi Domingo as the show's media correspondent. Incidentally, this marks Gonzaga and Domingo's third time to work together after Pinoy Big Brother: Unlimited and Pinoy Big Brother: Teen Edition 4 which were also under the unit of Director Lauren Dyogi.

On February 6, 2013, it was announced that Sarah Geronimo will be one of the four coaches. During the last episode of Sarah G. Live on February 10, 2013, Bamboo Mañalac revealed that he was proud that he will be collaborating with Geronimo on a new big project, which will be The Voice of the Philippines. On February 14, 2013, ABS-CBN aired a promotional plug during the airtime of Kahit Konting Pagtingin, a pre-primetime television drama, confirming Bamboo Mañalac's stint in the show as coach and judge. On the night of February 19, 2013, Lea Salonga confirmed her stint as an official coach in the show via her official Twitter account. In the same night, ABS-CBN later confirmed Salonga's role on the show. It was announced in early March 2013 that apl.de.ap of The Black Eyed Peas was being negotiated to join the said reality show. On March 7, 2013, it was announced through ABS-CBN's entertainment website, Push, that apl.de.ap will sit as the fourth coach. On an article posted in the network's official website dated March 20, 2013, apl.de.ap was slated to do the initial promotional plug with TFC London and was scheduled to arrive in Manila by April to meet and work with the three other coaches and the rest of the show's team.

On April 16, 2013, Alex Gonzaga, the younger sister of Toni Gonzaga, was revealed to join the show, teaming up with Robi Domingo as V-Reporters or as the show's social media correspondents.

Prizes
The winner of The Voice of the Philippines is set to win an entertainment package from Sony Bravia, an Asian tour for two, a brand new car from Ford Philippines, a tax-free cash prize of 2 million pesos, and a four-year recording contract from MCA Universal.

Auditions

Auditions started in September 2012. Open Call Auditions were held on September 15, 2012 at Island Pacific Supermarket in Panorama City, Los Angeles, California and on September 16, 2012 at California's Great America Parkway in Santa Clara, California. The auditions were only open to people with Filipino ancestry in Southern California.

Radio screenings were also held on January 7–11, 2013 at various ABS-CBN Radio stations in key cities such as Metro Manila, Naga, Legazpi City, Baguio, Tacloban, Cebu City, Davao City, General Santos, Zamboanga City, Cagayan de Oro, Bacolod, Iloilo City, and Dagupan. Radio screenings were called The Voice ng Radyo (The Voice of Radio), where daily and weekly winners will have the chance to participate in the Blind auditions.

Auditions in key cities throughout the Philippines were announced in the finale episode of Sarah G. Live, Sarah Geronimo's night variety show, on February 10, 2013. On the same night, the online auditions were also introduced which ran from February 9 to 19, 2013.

Teams
Color key

	

	

Blind auditions
[[File:The Voice of the Philippines - Blind auditions screenshot.jpg|300px|thumbnail|right|The Voice of the Philippines coaches (from left to right): Bamboo Mañalac, Sarah Geronimo, Lea Salonga, and apl.de.ap sitting on their respective red chairs while waiting for the artist to perform during the Blind auditions.]]
The Blind auditions, which was the main highlight of the show, were filmed last April 2013. Geronimo, on an interview made by The Buzz last April 14, 2013, elaborated that the first day of taping for the blind auditions started on April 15, 2013 and ended on April 18, 2013 in Studio 2 – ABS-CBN Broadcasting Center, Quezon City, Metro Manila. In an article published by Philippine Daily Inquirer and written by Lea Salonga, she wrote that a total of one hundred twenty one artists performed during the Blind auditions.

During the guest appearance of the four coaches on July 11, 2013 in ABS-CBN's noontime variety show, It's Showtime, Salonga teased for a 'big twist' that will affect the mechanics of forming their final teams who will be going into the Battles. Initially, it was reported that, from one hundred twenty one artists, only forty eight artists will advance to the Battles. However, in the said twist revealed last July 21, 2013, an additional artist was added per team. Thus increasing the total number of artists advancing to the Battles to fifty two.

The Blind auditions, composed of thirteen episodes, were aired from June 15, 2013 until July 27, 2013.

Color key

Episode 1 (June 15)
The first episode was graced by an opening performance of the coaches and sang their own rendition of "Hall of Fame" by The Script.

Episode 2 (June 16)

Episode 3 (June 22)

Episode 4 (June 23)

Episode 5 (June 29)

Episode 6 (June 30)

Episode 7 (July 6)

Episode 8 (July 7)

Episode 9 (July 13)

Episode 10 (July 14)

Episode 11 (July 20)

Episode 12 (July 21)

Episode 13 (July 27)

The Battles

The Battles were filmed on July 8 and 9, 2013 at the Studio 10 of ABS-CBN Broadcasting Center in Quezon City. From the one hundred twenty one invited artists during the Blind auditions, only fifty two artists will proceed to the Battles. Each coach will pick two to three artists and pit them together into a battle of vocals. The winner of the battle will only be determined by his or her coach. The other coaches can only provide their comments to the performances of the artists. The winner will earn a spot in the six artist-slots per team and will advance to the next round, the Live shows.

Prior to the battle of vocals, each team will be guided and trained by their respective coaches with the aid of some "guest advisers." Arnel Pineda, the frontman of Journey, aided apl.de.ap's team; while Gerard Salonga, an orchestrator and musical director, accompanied his sister Lea Salonga. On the other hand, Gary Valenciano helped Sarah Geronimo; while Joey Ayala, a contemporary pop music artist, joined Bamboo Mañalac.

The first episode aired on July 28, 2013. The Battles aired until August 17, 2013.

In some episodes guests were invited to perform for the show, while the coaches and their guest advisers performed in the remaining episodes of the Battles. During the first episode, Yeng Constantino, KZ Tandingan, and Charice performed "Locked out of Heaven" by Bruno Mars. On the second episode aired last August 3, 2013, coach Sarah Geronimo and her guest adviser, Gary Valenciano, performed "Clarity" by Zedd; while Bamboo Mañalac and Joey Ayala performed Mañalac's "Ikot ng Mundo" on the third episode aired last August 4, 2013. In the fourth episode aired on August 10, 2013, it was Lea Salonga along with her brother, Gerard Salonga, performed in the Battle stage. Lea sang "Grenade" by Bruno Mars while Gerard was at the piano playing the song. On August 11, 2013, apl.de.ap, together with A.K.A Jam member Jhelsea Flores, performed a medley of his songs and his group, The Black Eyed Peas. In the middle of the episode aired on August 17, 2013, the Gonzaga sisters made a special number were they performed "Heart Attack" by Demi Lovato.

Color key

Live shows

The Live Shows first aired on August 25, 2013 at the Newport Performing Arts Theater, a theater with a 1,500 audience capacity, Resorts World Manila in Newport City, Pasay, Metro Manila. It aired every Sundays and was the only part of the show which was broadcast live. A total of twenty-four artists, or six artists per team, made it to the last stage of the competition. For each live show, all four coaches pitted half of his/her team whom all performed a solo number on stage for the public's votes. Differentiating from its foreign counterparts, the performances and the results were aired on the same night. The voting lines were immediately opened after all the performances per team are finished. Viewers were then given approximately 10 minutes during commercial break to vote for which artist from each team should advance. During Saturday episodes, the show highlighted the life stories of the artists, and coaching and mentoring sessions called The Life Shows. The show served as a companion episode to the Live show to be aired the following day. Prior to the Live shows, a special episode was aired on August 18, 2013 which highlighted the coaches and their respective artists' bonding and coaching moments, and their preparation for the Live shows.

The voting system for the Live shows was based on the public's decision through different platforms (text messaging, using vote cards, and iTunes downloads of the studio versions of the artists' performances), and by the coaches. Each week during the first two Live shows, the accumulated votes from the public chose the first artist to advance from each team. Their respective coaches chose the second. From the third Live shows, the iTunes bonus took effect and the artists' was decided by an equal say from both the public's vote and their respective coach's scores. In the Finals, each team was represented by one artist and the winner of the competition was only decided by the public's vote.

On September 17, 2013, the setup for the fifth Live show was changed wherein it is composed of two episodes, one of which had replaced The Life Shows episode. The voting mechanics was also changed. Voting lines were still opened during the 10-minute commercial gap wherein the accumulated votes for the Saturday and Sunday episodes were summed up. The fifth Live show also featured an à la Battle performance wherein the final two artists per team performed one song, deviating from the usual solo performances of the artists from the four other Live shows.

Color key

Weeks 1 and 2
After the Top 24 were decided, with six finalists for each coach, August 25, 2013 saw the launching of the live shows with half of the teams performing.

Public voting across multiple platforms commenced at this point, with two artists eliminated from each participating team in the first two live shows. Voting lines were opened immediately after the broadcast of each live show. Each team will advance four artists, with two drawing from public votes and two from the coach's choice.

Weeks 3 and 4
After the Top 16 were decided, with four finalists for each coach, August 25, 2013 saw the launching of the live shows with half of the teams performing.

Public voting across multiple platforms commenced at this point, with two artists eliminated from each participating team in the first two live shows. Voting lines were opened immediately after the broadcast of each live show.

For the first week, four artists reached the Top 10 of the Philippine iTunes chart. Darryl Shy peaked at #1, Paolo Onesa at #3, Morissette at #5, and Maki Ricafort at #10.

For the second week, Myk Perez peaked at #1, Radha at #2, Klarisse de Guzman at #3, and Isabella Fabregas' version of "No One" peaked at #9.

Week 5: Semifinals
The fifth Live show was aired as a two-part episode. The September 21 episode also served as special charity event in benefit of the Payatas Kids Choir.

Recorded versions of the Top 4’s performances on Sunday made the Top 10 iTunes charts, with De Guzman at No 3, Perez at No. 4, and Javier at No. 7. The Top 4 contestants' original songs peaked the top four slots of the chart.

Week 6: Finals
Just like the previous Live show, the finale was also aired as a two-part episode. It also had a different set of voting mechanics. Eligibility to download songs from iTunes and through mobile truetone downloads were opened immediately after the end of the fifth Live show wherein each song downloaded was equal to 5 votes per artist. Voting lines were opened at the start of the first episode of the finale and was temporarily paused after. The votes accumulated on Saturday were then summed up with the votes accumulated from the downloads. The results of the votes were then revealed on the second episode of the finals, where the final two artists had to perform in a final showdown. After the two top artists were revealed, the scores were reset to zero. The voting lines were then opened for the final two, wherein the artist who garnered the highest votes was declared the winner of the competition. The finals was held in Newport Performing Arts Theater, Resorts World Manila, Pasay.

Color key

First round

Second round

Elimination Chart
Results summary
Color key
Artist's info

Result details

Teams

Artist's info

Result details

Notes^  Thor was automatically saved from elimination after he received 43.63% of the public's vote, the highest percentage in Team apl; in Team Lea, Darryl Shy received 51.41%; in Team Bamboo, Myk Perez received the 54.80%; and in Team Sarah, Morissette received 57.16%.^'  Paolo Onesa was automatically saved from elimination after he received 46.37% of the public's vote, the highest percentage in Team Bamboo; In Team Sarah, Maki Ricafort received 36.75%; In Team apl, Janice Javier received 42.82%; and in Team Lea, Mitoy Yonting received 82.29%.

Artists who appeared on other talent shows
Eliminated in the Blind auditions
 Andy Go and Katrina Madrigal, of the singing trio called the Madrigal Siblings, appeared on Pilipinas Got Talent, a reality talent competition on ABS-CBN. Go appeared in the first season, but failed to get two out of the three required 'yes votes' in order to advance to the "Judges' Cull." Meanwhile, Madrigal — together with her group, Madrigal Siblings — reached the second season finals and finished ninth place.
 Edward Benosa was one of the top twenty-eight contestants in the fifth season of StarStruck, a reality artist search on GMA, but failed to advance.
 Monique delos Santos appeared in the tenth season of American Idol, a reality singing competition on FOX, but failed to advance to the semifinal rounds.
 Wilson Peñaflor appeared in Protégé: The Battle For The Big Break, a reality singing competition on GMA. He was eliminated during the "Face off" round.
 Charlene and Charmaine Albino auditioned for the first season of K-Pop Star Hunt on tvN. Charlene made it to the top eleven, while Charmaine made it to the top five.
 Its Saludo and Chivas Malunda both appeared in Pinoy Dream Academy, a reality singing competition on ABS-CBN. Saludo only lasted as a semifinalist in the first season and was not able to become part of the final twenty. Meanwhile, Malunda was part of the top sixteen finalists of the second season, but was disqualified twelve days after the start of the show due to health concerns.

Eliminated in the Battles
 Dan Billano, and Angelica Prado appeared in the first season of The X Factor Philippines, a reality singing competition on ABS-CBN. Billano failed to advance to the "Bootcamp Stage;" Prado was able to get through the "Bootcamp Stage" but ended her stint at the "Judge's homes."
Rainer Acosta was part of a group called Paragon Child which had competed on Gang Starz, a reality singing competition for bands on TV3. The group ended as runner up.
 Willy Cordovales, of the Cordovales Father & Son duo, appeared in the third season of Pilipinas Got Talent on ABS-CBN. He was one of the semifinalists in the second semifinals week, but failed to advance to the finals. He was also a contestant in Tanghalan ng Kampeon during the 1990s on GMA, but also failed to win the competition.

Advanced to the Live shows
 Eva delos Santos appeared in the first season of The X Factor Philippines, a reality singing competition on ABS-CBN. delos Santos was able to pass the auditions, however, she failed to advance to the "Bootcamp Stage."
 Penelope Matanguihan appeared in Pinoy Idol on GMA. She was one of the top twelve finalists on the show, but was eliminated during the top seven round.
 Morissette was part of Star Factor, an artist and talent search on TV5. She ended as the runner-up of the said show.
 Jessica Reynoso was a finalist in the second season of Popstar Kids, a reality singing search for kids on Q.
 Klarisse de Guzman was part of Star for a Night, a reality singing search on IBC, who once competed against a then-teenager Coach Sarah, but was eliminated and failed to be part of the roster of the top finalists. She also appeared in the third regular season of Your Face Sounds Familliar as a contestant.
 Mitoy Yonting appeared on GMA-7's noontime show Eat Bulaga! as a contestant on Ikaw at Echo in 2001 and Kakaibang Bida (English: "Different Hero") in 2009.

Music releases
Singles
Every week since the third Live show, the songs performed by the artists were digitally available on iTunes for download. The versions released on the online platform were studio versions of the songs they have performed.

Albums
Two albums were released in September 2013 with the Top 16 artists' studio version of the songs they performed on the Third and Fourth Live shows, and the Top 8 artists' original songs all produced and distributed by MCA/Universal.

Reception
Critical reception

During the pilot episode, the show received fairly negative reviews from the viewers emphasizing the design of the infamous red chairs, and set. The show was also observed having longer commercial loads ending up to a huge gaps per show. The coaches' opening performance was also deemed unrehearsed. Pooled reviews from novices of the franchise stated that the coaches were found to be a bit exaggerated on television. Avid fanatics of the franchise however explained that certain aspects of the said coaches can also be seen across franchises. Ms. Lea Salonga together with her fellow coaches were even bashed on Twitter. On an article written by Joey Aquino of The People's Journal on June 21, 2013, Aquino commented that Salonga has already gave much prestige to the country and with the bashing that had happened on Twitter, Salonga deserves much respect that she is entitled.

Aside from the pilot week reviews and criticisms, the show was also criticized for Bamboo Mañalac's controversial decisions. Mañalac received many negative comments after the season one's first episode of the Battles aired last July 28, 2013 after he made a controversial choice on picking Lee Grane Maranan over Dan Billano. The two performed the ballad song "One" by U2, wherein Maranan was vocally outperformed by Billano. Billano was even praised by Joey Ayala, Mañalac's guest adviser during the Battles, and that according to him Billano was the clear winner of that Team Bamboo's first vocal battle. Billano was also praised by apl.de.ap; while Maranan was praised by Lea Salonga for her emotional delivery of the song. Mañalac's choice of letting Maranan win over Billano was based on the former's soulfulness and emotions rather than basing the result on the two's vocal performances, which caused rave of negative comments from the netizens. It is noted that Maranan was a crowd favorite during her Blind auditions. Maranan undeniably admitted her loss over Billano but he thanked her coach for picking her and later added a promise that she will do better in the next round of the competition.

Television ratings
Television ratings for the first season of The Voice of the Philippines'' on ABS-CBN were gathered from two major sources, namely from AGB Nielsen and Kantar Media. AGB Nielsen's survey ratings were gathered from Mega Manila households, while Kantar Media's survey ratings were gathered from urban and rural households all over the Philippines.

References

External links
 The Voice of the Philippines (season 1) on ABS-CBN

The Voice of the Philippines
2013 Philippine television seasons